Salam Sour Sports Club is a football club based in Tyre, Lebanon, that competes in the . They play their home matches at the Sour Stadium.

Club rivalries 
The club plays the Tyre derby against Tadamon Sour, as both are based in the same city.

Honours 
 Lebanese Second Division
 Winners (1): 2009–10
 Lebanese Third Division
Winners (2): 1995–96, 2008–09

See also 
 List of football clubs in Lebanon

References

Football clubs in Lebanon